Catalpa is a genus of flowering plants in the family Bignoniaceae.

Catalpa may also refer to:

Places 
Catalpa, Missouri, an unincorporated community
Catalpa, Nebraska, an unincorporated community
Catalpa (Greenfield, Iowa), listed on the NRHP in Iowa
Catalpa (St. Francisville, Louisiana), listed on the NRHP in Louisiana
Catalpa Farm, Princess Anne, MD, listed on the NRHP in Maryland
Catalpa (Culpeper, Virginia), a plantation near Culpeper in Culpeper County, Virginia

Other 
 Catalpa Festival, held in New York City
Catalpa rescue, a historical rescue involving a ship named Catalpa
Catalpa (album), an album by Jolie Holland
USS Catalpa